The discography of American DJ duo the Chainsmokers consists of four studio albums, one soundtrack, fifteen extended plays, forty one singles, three promotional singles, thirty-three music videos, and thirty-eight remixes.

Their 2014 song "#Selfie" became their first ever single to chart in a country, peaking at number two in Sweden, number sixteen on the US Billboard Hot 100 chart, number three in Australia, and number eleven in the United Kingdom. They released their debut EP, Bouquet, in October 2015. Their following single "Roses" reached the top ten on the Billboard Hot 100, while "Don't Let Me Down" became their first top five single. Later in 2016, the duo released another single "Closer". It became the Chainsmokers' first number-one single on the Billboard Hot 100, staying at number one for 12 consecutive weeks, and in the top five for 26 consecutive weeks. They released their second EP, Collage, in November 2016. In April 2017, they released their debut studio album Memories...Do Not Open, which debuted at number one on the US Billboard 200 and was certified platinum after five months.

They released their second album Sick Boy on December 14, 2018. It features the hit single "This Feeling" featuring Kelsea Ballerini.

Their third album World War Joy was released on December 6, 2019. It features the hit singles "Who Do You Love" featuring 5 Seconds of Summer and "Call You Mine" featuring Bebe Rexha.

Their fourth and latest album So Far So Good, was released on May 13, 2022. It features the hit single "High".

Albums

Studio albums

Remix albums

Soundtrack albums

Extended plays

Singles

Promotional singles

Other charted songs

Remixes

Songwriting and production credits

Music videos

Notes

References

Discographies of American artists
Electronic music discographies
disco